Mathieu Rodrigues (born 7 November 1985) is a French professional tennis player. He competes mainly on the ATP Challenger Tour and ITF Futures, both in singles and doubles. He reached his highest ATP singles ranking, No. 221 on 24 October 2011, and his highest ATP doubles ranking, No. 549, on 3 October 2011.

References

External links
 
 

1985 births
Living people
French male tennis players
Sportspeople from Loir-et-Cher
21st-century French people